Feruza Turdiboeva (born 6 January 1994) is an Uzbekistani footballer who plays as a forward. She has been a member of the Uzbekistan women's national team.

International goals

See also
List of Uzbekistan women's international footballers

References 

1994 births
Living people
Uzbekistani women's footballers
Uzbekistan women's international footballers
Women's association football forwards
People from Tashkent Region
Uzbekistani women's futsal players
20th-century Uzbekistani women
21st-century Uzbekistani women